The Eighteen Year Old is a 1927 German silent drama film directed by Manfred Noa and starring Andrée Lafayette, Ernő Verebes, and Frida Richard.

It was made at the Staaken Studios in Berlin. The film's sets were designed by Karl Machus.

Cast

References

Bibliography

External links

1927 films
1927 drama films
Films of the Weimar Republic
German silent feature films
German drama films
Films directed by Manfred Noa
Bavaria Film films
Films shot at Staaken Studios
German black-and-white films
Silent drama films
1920s German films
1920s German-language films